The  are major megathrust earthquakes that affect the Nankaidō (Southern Sea Circuit) region of Japan, west of the Tōnankai region (Southeastern Sea) and Tōkai region (Eastern Sea), and are caused by ruptures in the Nankai zone of the Nankai megathrust, specifically segments A and/or B. They occur with a return period of 100 to 200 years, and there is a high probability of one in the 21st century, as the most recent was the 1946 Nankaidō earthquake. These have high destructive potential, and thus are a focus of earthquake preparation.These are a class of Nankai megathrust earthquakes, frequently occurring in combination with, or following, a rupture of segments C and/or D (Tōnankai zone, yielding Tōnankai earthquakes) and sometimes segment E (Tōkai zone, yielding Tōkai earthquakes).

History
Historical Nankai earthquakes are as follows; some of these coincided with or followed earthquakes in the Tōnankai or Tōkai zones, and the 1498 Meiō Nankaidō earthquake may or may not have involved the Nankai zone:
 684 Hakuho Nankai earthquake
 887 Ninna Nankai earthquake
 1099 Kōwa Nankaido earthquake
 1361 Shōhei Nankaido earthquake
 1605 Keichō Nankaido earthquake (also Tōnankai: A+B+C+D)
 1707 Hōei earthquake (also Tōnankai and Tōkai: A+B+C+D+E)
 1854 Ansei-Nankai earthquake (following 1854 Ansei-Tōkai earthquake the previous day)
 1946 Nankaidō earthquake (following 1944 Tōnankai earthquake)

References

Megathrust earthquakes in Japan
Nankaido
Earthquake clusters, swarms, and sequences